Our Lady of Good Counsel Church, is a church located in Żejtun, Malta.

History
The church is the private chapel of the adjacent Aedes Danielis Palace built by the Testaferrata Bonnici family who also built the nearby St Angelo's Church. A permission to build the chapel was given on 7 April, 1753. through the initiative of Neriku Testaferrata and blessed by Archbishop Paul Alphéran de Bussan. The chapel was consecrated by Archbishop Pietro Pace on December 8, 1891.

In the 1980s the church was ransacked and a sizable amount of priceless valuables were stolen. The church remains the private property of the Testaferrata Bonnici family.

See also
 Ædes Danielis
 Catholic Church in Malta

References

1750 establishments in Malta
Żejtun
National Inventory of the Cultural Property of the Maltese Islands
Limestone churches in Malta
Roman Catholic churches completed in 1750
Roman Catholic chapels in Malta
18th-century Roman Catholic church buildings in Malta